Gheorghe Șincai National College is a high school located at 167 Calea Șerban Vodă, Bucharest, Romania.

History
The school traces its origins to autumn 1890, when two classes were split off from the overcrowded Matei Basarab High School. Another class was added a year later. A royal decree issued in December 1892 by Education Minister Take Ionescu established the institution as a classical gymnasium. Upon the proposal of a teacher from Transylvania, it was named after Gheorghe Șincai. It became a high school in 1919.

The present building was begun in 1924, and was ready for use in 1928. In 1948, the new communist regime dropped the Șincai name, which was restored in 1957. Meanwhile, a girls’ high school functioned in the same building until 1956, when the two were merged. Șincai was declared a national college in 2002.

The school building is listed as a historic monument by Romania's Ministry of Culture and Religious Affairs, as is the sculpture of Șincai by Ion Schmidt-Faur, in front of the school entrance.

Alumni
Florența Albu
Paula Ivan
Gheorghe Mihoc
Gică Petrescu
Nicolae Saramandu

Notes

External links

 Official site

High schools in Bucharest
Educational institutions established in 1890
1890 establishments in Romania
School buildings completed in 1928
National Colleges in Romania
Historic monuments in Bucharest